Orian Williams (born 11 November 1965) is an American film producer. Williams is best known for the Oscar and Golden Globe-nominated Willem Dafoe/John Malkovich film Shadow of the Vampire, as well as the BIFA-winning Control, an Ian Curtis biopic which also received multiple Cannes and BAFTA awards.

Partial filmography

References

External links
 

1965 births
Living people
Film producers from Mississippi